Canaan Records is a Christian record label and is a subsidiary of Word Entertainment.

History 
The label was started in 1965, by Marvin Norcross, for the label's Southern gospel quartets. Their biggest artist to date is the Happy Goodman Family. After being absent from the southern gospel music industry for several years, Word Entertainment revived the Canaan Records label in 2007, placing Dave Clark as the General Manager of the label and announcing Canaan's relaunch on June 6, 2007. The first group to sign with the label after the relaunch was Southern gospel veteran group, The Hoppers. They released their first Canaan Records album, The Ride, on September 4, 2007.

Early labels were red with black print. Later, the label changed to black with a color logo and a distinctive vertical row of colored dots down the middle of the label. In the mid-1980s, the label changed to a full color label showing a desert town (presumably Canaan) at sunset, with colors fading from green to yellow to orange in the sky, and tones of brown for the sand. For the 2007 relaunch of Canaan Records, the logo was changed to display the word "Canaan" in a script-style font, with the word "RECORDS" below in a sans-serif font. The label name was surrounded on either side by arching curves, implying an oval shape around the words. In 2009, Word Records again closed the doors on Canaan Records.

Select Canaan artists 
 Wendy Bagwell and the Sunliters
 The Happy Goodman Family (1965-1983)
 Rusty Goodman (1977-1985)
 Vestal Goodman
 Tanya Goodman Sykes
 The Inspirations
 Teddy Huffam and The Gems
 The Plainsmen Quartet
 The Florida Boys
 The Lefevres
 The Rebels
 The Couriers Quartet
 The Hemphills
 The Cathedrals
 The Rex Nelon Singers (later called The Nelons)
 Jimmie Davis
 The Singing Christians (1975-1979)
 The Hoppers (2007-2008)
 Kim Hopper (2008)
 Mike And Kelly Bowling (2008)
 Lefevre Quartet (2008)
 Lewis Family
 The Talleys
 Mercy River Boys (1979-1984)

See also 
 List of record labels

References 

American record labels
Christian record labels
Record labels established in 1965
Record labels established in 2007
Record labels disestablished in 2009
Re-established companies
Southern gospel performers